Walter W. "Punk" Wood (1894 – 1980) was an American football player and a football, basketball, and baseball coach. He lettered three times as a quarterback and center at the University of Kansas (1914–1915, 1919).

Wood began his coaching career at Shurtleff College in Illinois. He followed that up with tenures as the head football coach (1923–1924), head men's basketball coach (1924–1925), and head baseball coach (1924–1925) at Muhlenberg College in Allentown, Pennsylvania. He returned to his hometown of Alton, Illinois to serve as a coach at the local high school.

References

External links
 

1894 births
1980 deaths
American football centers
American football quarterbacks
Basketball coaches from Illinois
Kansas Jayhawks football players
Muhlenberg Mules baseball coaches
Muhlenberg Mules football coaches
Muhlenberg Mules men's basketball coaches
Shurtleff Pioneers football coaches
Sportspeople from Greater St. Louis
High school basketball coaches in Illinois
People from Alton, Illinois
Players of American football from Illinois